India Runway Week (IRW) is a biannual trade event held in New Delhi, India, primarily for young emerging fashion designers. It is among India's top three fashion-week platforms and features summer and winter editions. The Indian Federation for Fashion Development (IFFD) founded and coordinates the event. Admission to shows at India Runway Week is typically by invitation only.

History 
The Indian Federation for Fashion Development (IFFD) created India Runway Week to showcase young emerging Indian designers that fashion journalists usually neglect. IFFD was founded in February 2012 in New Delhi by Avinash Pathania and Kiran Kheva when both were in their early twenties. 

In August 2013, IFDD held season one of India Runway Week. The two-day event featured collections by fourteen designers and two show directors. It was a fashion trade event on par with fashion weeks around the globe. As a result, India Runway Week's first season was a success. Leading newspapers such as the Times of India, Hindustan Times, The Hindu, Deccan Herald, and The Statesman increased their coverage of young designers..

Beverly Models being the official casting partner since the beginning and has done all the castings and backstage management.

Events

2014 
The second season of India Runway Week was in April 2014. It was a three-day event featuring twenty designers and two show directors. The third season was in September 2014. Again, it was a three-day event but expanded to include 29 designers and three show directors.

2015 
The fourth season of India Runway Week was a three-day event in the spring of 2015 with 34 designers and two show directors. The fifth season in September 2015 was a three-day event with 41 designers and two show directors. Actress Gauahar Khan walked the runway for jewelry designer Akassh K Aggarwal. Other designers included Pallavi A. Agrawal, Ankita and Akshita, Ishan Jain, Kanika and Sugandh, Nidhi Kejriwal, Bani Pasricha, Ojasvita Mahendru, Preyal and Amisha, Purvi and Aanal, Rishi and Soujit, Divya Shah and Lipsa Jain, and Urvashi and Sukanya. Designer Shravan Kumar Ramaswamy's collection was the finale and featured actress Adah Sharma on the runway.

2016 
The sixth season of India Runway Week was a three-day event in April 2016 with 48 designers and three show directors. Actress Anita Hassanandani walked the runway for designer Richa Ranaut. Actress Mandria Bedi and transgender rights activist Laxmi Narayan Tripathi walked the runway for Akassh K. Aggarwa who designs gender equality jewelry. Celebrities Vahbbiz Dorabjee, Mehrene Pirzada, Sukhwinder Singh were also models. Other designers who showed their collections at the sixth season were  Ashok Maanay, Architha Narayanam, Dheeru & Nitika, Nandita Ramesh, and Rajdeep Ranawat. Designer Agnimitra Paul had the finale position, with singer Babul Supriyo walking the runway as a showstopper.

In September 2016, the seventh season of India Runway Week was a three-day event with 43 designers and two show directors. A second show area, the Fashion Brooder Runway, hosted ah opening show by Bibi Russell with by supercars like Ferrari, Audi, and Lamborghini.  Some of the celebrities at the seventh season were Zeenat Aman,  Mugdha Godse, Esha Gupta, Soha Ali Khan, and Sharmila Tagore.

2017 
In April 2017, the eighth season of India Runway Week was a three-day event featuring collections by 39 designers and four non-government organizations that worked with weavers from different states. The opening show featured the young emerging designer Ken Ferns. Kristy De Cunha had the closing show. Some of the celebrities at the eighth India Runway Week were Swara Bhaskar, Gauhar Khan, Shamita Shetty, Mugdha Godse, Poonam Dhillon, Mr. World Rohit Khandelwal, and Mannara Chopra.

2018 
The tenth season of Indian Fashion Week was in April 2018. "The Bride" collection by www.Pairahann.com premiered on day three.

2019 
In March 2019, the eleventh season of India Runway Week was a three-day event with more than thirty designers. Veteran designer Rina Dhaka opened the event. Vidya Institute of Fashion and Technology students also showcased their collections. Social Activist Laxmi Aggarwal appeared as a showstopper for one of the shows. Many social media influencers dropped by the event's Versus by Versace lounge.  

The twelfth season of India Runway Week was a three-day event in October 2019. It moved to a new venue, Select Citywalk, and featured more than thirty designers, including Aayana by Siimi, Akassh K Aggarwal, Ted Baker, Jaivik Naari, and Nikhita Tandon. The event also spread a breast cancer awareness message in association with the cosmetic company Avon, which hosted a panel discussion. In addition, breast cancer survivors walked the runway for designer Anupamaa Dayal. The event's finale show featured a collection by Nida Mahmood. The celebrities who walked the ramp this season included Vaani Kapoor, Neelima Azeem, and Esha Gupta.

2020 
In September 2020, India Runway Week was a virtual edition on Instagram. The event featured 35 designers and many celebrities, including Samant Chauhan, Poonam Dubey, Manish Gupta, Kaaisha by Shalini, Anjalee, Arjun Kapoor, Ashima Leena, Niki Mahajan, Nikhita Tandon, Nikhil Thampi, and Siddharth Tytler.

References

Fashion events in India
Indian fashion designers